The 1942 Idaho Vandals football team represented the University of Idaho in the 1942 college football season. The Vandals were led by second-year head coach Francis Schmidt and were members of the Pacific Coast Conference. Home games were played on campus in Moscow at Neale Stadium, with one game in Boise at Public School Field, the last in southern Idaho for five years.

Schmidt, age 56, was a longtime college football head coach, most recently in the Big Ten Conference at Ohio State University  where he was succeeded by a 32-year-old high school coach named Paul Brown.

Shortly before the start of the 1943 season, the Idaho football program (with Washington State and Oregon State) went on hiatus due to  two seasons were missed and Vandal football returned in 1945.

Season

Prior to their second-ever night game, played at Gonzaga Stadium in Spokane against the Second Air Force on October 3, the Vandals practiced under the lights in Moscow with white and yellow footballs. They had won their first the previous year over Gonzaga, but lost to the military team, 14–0.

In the Battle of the Palouse with neighbor Washington State, the Vandals suffered a fifteenth straight loss, falling  on a soggy field at Neale Stadium in Moscow on November 14. Idaho's most recent win in the series was a 17 years earlier in 1925 and the next was a dozen years away, in 1954.

Two weeks earlier on Halloween, Idaho broke a rare three-game losing streak to Montana in the rivalry game for the Little Brown Stein with a 21-point shutout at Missoula. The Vandals turned the tables on the Griz, who had shut out Idaho the previous year in Moscow. When Montana was a member of the PCC (through 1949), the loser of the game was frequently last in the conference standings.

The final game was in Los Angeles on December 5, a 40–13 loss to the UCLA Bruins, the conference champions who were Rose Bowl-bound.

Schedule

 One game was played on Friday (Eastern Washington at Cheney)and one on Thursday (Utah at Salt Lake City on Thanksgiving)
 One game was played at night (Second Air Force at Spokane)

All-conference
No Vandals were named to the All-Coast team.

NFL Draft
Three Vandal seniors were selected in the 1943 NFL Draft, which lasted 32 rounds (300 selections).

List of Idaho Vandals in the NFL Draft

After the season
Like many colleges, the football program at Idaho was stopped during the war due to manpower shortages, made  official in late September 1943. Schmidt continued to reside in Moscow, but his health began to fail in the spring of 1944. He spent his last three weeks at St. Luke's Hospital in Spokane, Washington, where he died on September 19 at age 58.

UI alumnus and assistant coach James "Babe" Brown, the acting athletic director and head basketball coach, became the interim head football coach for 1945 and the head coach in 1946.

References

External links
Gem of the Mountains: 1943 University of Idaho yearbook – 1942 football season
Go Mighty Vandals – 1942 football season
Idaho Argonaut – student newspaper – 1942 editions
College Football Data Warehouse  – Idaho Vandals (1940–44)

Idaho
Idaho Vandals football seasons
Idaho Vandals football